Nguyễn Thị Phương (born 2 September 1976) is a Vietnamese breaststroke swimmer. She competed in two events at the 1992 Summer Olympics.

References

External links
 

1976 births
Living people
Vietnamese female swimmers
Olympic swimmers of Vietnam
Swimmers at the 1992 Summer Olympics
Place of birth missing (living people)
21st-century Vietnamese women